Miss Davis (c. 1726 – after 1755) was an Irish singer, musician and composer, born in Dublin, Ireland. Her father was a harpsichord player, and her mother was a singer who promoted her daughter as a child prodigy. Miss Davis had her debut in London on 10 May 1745. She later wrote and performed her own songs, none of which survive.

In 1755 the Dublin Journal published a notice that Miss Davis had retired from playing in public, but continued to teach ladies. She is thought to have died in Dublin.

References

1726 births
18th-century classical composers
Irish Baroque composers
Date of death unknown
Year of death unknown
Irish classical composers
Irish women classical composers
Irish songwriters
18th-century Irish women
18th-century Irish singers
18th-century Irish musicians
18th-century women composers